The year 2019 was the fifth year in the history of the Rizin Fighting Federation, a mixed martial arts promotion based in Japan. The season started with Rizin Fighting Federation in Yokohama. It started broadcasting through a television agreement with  Fuji Television. In North America and Europe Rizin FF is available on PPV all over the world and on FITE TV.

Background
Nobuyuki Sakakibara announced that Rizin will do 6 events in 2019: April, June, July, August, October, and the usual December 31 show.

He also announced that they will do a lightweight Grand Prix this year. Bellator MMA CEO Scott Coker has announced that he will be sending Patricky Freire to participate in the opening round.

Rizin's Lightweight grand prix will begin on October 12 at the Osaka-jo Hall, with the four opening rounds bouts of the tournament bracket. The semifinals and finals will be held on Dec. 31, at Saitama Super Arena.

List of events

Title fights

Rizin Lightweight Grand Prix

8-Man Lightweight Grand Prix Participant
  Hiroto Uesako
  Damien Brown
  Johnny Case
  Patricky Freire
  Roberto de Souza
  Tatsuya Kawajiri
  Luiz Gustavo

Rizin Lightweight Grand Prix bracket

Rizin 15 - Yokohama

Rizin 15 - Yokohama was a Combat sport event held by the Rizin Fighting Federation on April 21, 2019 at the Yokohama Arena in Yokohama, Japan.

Background
A light heavyweight bout between RIZIN top contender Jiří Procházka and former Strikeforce Light Heavyweight champion Muhammed Lawal will serve as the Rizin 15 - Yokohama main event. The bout will crown the inaugural RIZIN Light Heavyweight champion.

Ulka Sasaki has been forced to withdraw from his schedule fight against Kai Asakura due to a visceral infection and Justin Scoggins has stepped in as a replacement. Unfortunately, Scoggins has suffered a knee injury during training and has been unable to compete, that forced his fight against Kai Asakura to be cancelled.

Shinju Nozawa-Auclair was supposed to face Saray Orozco. However, Nozawa-Auclair suffered an ankle injury during training and was forced to withdraw from the fight. Kanako Murata has stepped in on short notice against Orozco.

Results

Rizin 16 - Kobe

Rizin 16 - Kobe was a Combat sport event held by the Rizin Fighting Federation on June 2, 2019 at the World Memorial Hall in Kobe, Japan.

Background
ISKA Featherweight Ahmed Ferradji was scheduled to defend his title against Tenshin Nasukawa at RIZIN 16, but  Ferradji withdrew from the scheduled fight. As a result, ISKA has stripped the title from Ferradji and ISKA Bantamweight Champion Martin Blanco has stepped in on short notice to face Nasukawa for the vacant ISKA Featherweight World Title.

Kizaemon Saiga was scheduled to face Kunitaka Fujiwara at RIZIN 16, but was not medically cleared for the event due to vision issues. Stepping in on a few days' notice to fight Fujiwara was the former K-1 Krush champion Ryuji Horio.

Results

Rizin 17 - Saitama

Rizin 17 - Saitama was a Combat sport event held by the Rizin Fighting Federation on July 28, 2019 at the Saitama Super Arena in Saitama, Japan.

Background
Daiki Watabe was due to fight Kevin Ross in a kickboxing bout, but the American fighter withdrew due to a hand injury. Watabe instead faced the Bolivian fighter Hideki, who stepped in on 3 weeks notice for this encounter.

Results

Rizin 18 - Nagoya

Rizin 18 - Nagoya was a Combat sport event held by the Rizin Fighting Federation on August 18, 2019 at the Aichi Prefectural Gymnasium  in Nagoya, Japan.

Background
Marcos de Souza, was set to fight at RIZIN 18, but his debut was pushed back because of an injury.

Kazuma Sone was expected to face Erson Yamamoto, But plans have changed for undisclosed reasons. That forced the fight to be cancelled. Justin Scoggins has stepped in as a replacement.

Results

Rizin 19 - Osaka

Rizin  19 - Osaka was a Combat sport event held by the Rizin Fighting Federation on October 12, 2019 at the Edion Arena in Osaka, Japan.

Background
Rena Kubota's original opponent, Shawna Ram suffered a concussion during training. Alexandra Alvare steps in to face Kubota.

Shintaro Matsukura originally supposed to face Takuma Konishi but he suffered an eye injury. His teammate, Hiroya, will be the replacement to face Konishi.

Results

Rizin 20 - Saitama

Rizin  20 - Saitama was a Combat sport event by Rizin Fighting Federation that took place on December 31, 2019 at the Saitama Super Arena in Saitama, Japan.

Background
Kyoji Horiguchi was scheduled to defend his RIZIN Bantamweight Championship against Kai Asakura on this card. However, Horoguchi pulled out of the fight in mid-November citing a knee injury that is expected to keep him out of action for approximately 10 – 12 months. In turn, his bantamweight title has been vacated.

Results

References

External links
 Official event
 

Rizin Fighting Federation
2019 in mixed martial arts
2019 in Japanese sport
2019 sport-related lists